Gluviella is a monotypic genus of daesiid camel spiders, first described by Ludovico di Caporiacco in 1948. Its single species, Gluviella rhodiensis is distributed in Greece (Rhodes).

References 

Solifugae
Arachnid genera
Monotypic arachnid genera